Miss World 2013, the 63rd edition of the Miss World pageant, was held on 28 September 2013 at Bali International Convention Center, South Kuta, Bali, Indonesia. It was the first time in Southeast Asia and it also was the first time in the pageant's history that the event was held in a Muslim majority country. Yu Wenxia of China crowned her successor Megan Young of the Philippines at the end of the event, marking the only time to date that the Philippines has won the Miss World title. This victory also made the Philippines the third country to win all of the Big Four international beauty pageants.

The show was hosted by singer and supermodel Myleene Klass, theatre Producer Kamal Ibrahim and Actor Daniel Mananta, while television personalities Amanda Zevannya and Steve Douglas provided commentary and analysis. Singer-songwriter Matt Cardle and Eurovision participant Blue, both of Britain, performed.

Results

Placements

§ — People's Choice winner(Voted into the Top 6 by viewers)

Continental Queens of Beauty

Challenge Events 
There were six challenge events. They were Top Model, Beach Fashion, Sport, Multimedia, Talent, and Beauty With a Purpose. Important points were awarded to each winner. All six winners went through to the Top 20.

Top Model 
Megan Young of Philippines won Miss World Top Model 2013.

Beach Beauty 
Sancler Frantz of Brazil won Miss World Beach Beauty 2013.

Sports and Fitness 
Jacqueline Steenbeek of Netherlands won Miss World Sport and Fitness 2013.

Multimedia 
Navneet Kaur Dhillon of India won Miss World Multimedia 2013.

Talent 
Vania Larissa of Indonesia won Miss World Talent 2013.

Beauty With a Purpose 
Ishani Shrestha of Nepal won Miss World Beauty With a Purpose 2013.

Contestants 
127 delegates competed.

Judges
The judges for Miss World 2013 were:

 Julia Morley – Chairman of the Miss World Organization
 Donna Derby
 Derek Wheeler
 Mike Dixon – Musical director
 Andrew Minarik
 Vineet Jain
 Azra Akın – Miss World 2002 from Turkey
 Maurice Montgomery Haughton-James
 Ken Warwick
 Liliana Tanoesoedibjo – Owner and National Director of Miss Indonesia.
 Liestyana Irman Gusman
 Silvia Agung Laksono
 Coretta Kapoyos Bayuseno

Notes
  - The Miss Taiwan organisation decided to change their name at Miss World to Chinese Taipei. After they last use Chinese Taipei on Miss World 2008.

Debuts

Returns

Last competed in 1975:
 
Last competed in 1978:
 
 
Last competed in 1988:
 
Last competed in 2001:
 
Last competed in 2005:
 
Last competed in 2008:
 
Last competed in 2010:
 
Last competed in 2011:

Designations
  – Maryia Vialichka was appointed to represent Belarus, after no national pageant was held because the Miss Belarus pageant is a bi-annual event. It was last time held in 2012. Maria won the title of Miss Charity at the Miss Belarus 2012 pageant.
  – Kirtis Kassandra Malone was appointed as Miss World British Virgin Islands 2013. The Miss World British Virgin Islands Committee acquired the franchise license from the Miss World organisation this year.
  – Kristy Marie Agapiou was appointed to represent Cyprus, she was the 1st runner-up at the Star Cyprus 2011 pageant.
  – Ruqayyah Boyer was appointed Miss Guyana 2013 after Natasha Martindale became the new national director in Guyana.
  – Sigríður Dagbjört Ásgeirsdóttir was appointed to represent Iceland, she was the 2nd runner-up at the Ungfrú Island 2011 pageant.
  – Aynur Toleuova was appointed to represent Kazakhstan. She was previously Miss Kazakhstan 2011.
  – Park Min-ji was appointed to represent Korea. She was the 2nd runner-up at the Miss World Korea 2011 pageant.
  – Pagmadulam Sukhbaatar was appointed as Miss World Mongolia 2013 after a casting call took place.
  – Luz Decena was appointed as Miss Mundo Nicaragua 2013 by Denis Davila, national director of Miss World in Nicaragua.
  – Alexandra Backström was appointed as Miss World Norway 2013 after a casting call took place.
  – Trevicia Adams was appointed as Miss World St. Kitts & Nevis 2013 by Eversley Liburd & Joan Millard, national directors of Miss World in St. Kitts & Nevis.
  – Olivia Jordan, a native of Tulsa, Oklahoma, was appointed to represent United States. She was the 1st runner-up at the Miss California USA 2013 pageant. Later competed at Miss USA 2015 as Miss Oklahoma USA and won the title and competed at Miss Universe 2015 and placed as 2nd runner-up.
  – Thảo Lại Hương was appointed to represent Vietnam. The permission was granted by the Ministry of Culture of Vietnam, which authorises the international representation of the nation in events of any kind. Thảo was crowned Miss Sport Vietnam 2012.
  – Christine Mwaaba was appointed to represent Zambia, she was the 2nd runner-up at the Miss Zambia 2010 pageant.

Replacements
  – The reigning Miss Hong Kong Carat Cheung was replaced by her 1st runner-up Jacqueline Wong due to being over-age.
  – Nikolina Bojić was replaced by Aleksandra Doknić the 1st runner-up of Miss Serbia 2012, after being withdrawn because of her marriage to Canadian tennis player Frank Dancevic.

Withdrawals
 
  
 
  – Yityish Titi Aynaw withdrew due to political reason regarding to Indonesia being an Islamic country. Later competed at Miss Universe 2013 in Moscow, but was unplaced.
  
  – Rachel De La Fuente
  – Mercedes Bissio Del Puerto

Did not compete
Note: These countries were to debut or return at Miss World, but did not compete.
  
  - Christina Spencer
  - Dianne Illiansen
  - Priscilla Collingsworth

Controversies
After protests from hard-line Islamic extremism groups threatened to force the pageant out of Indonesia, the national government announced that the finals would be moved from a venue near the capital city, to a venue on the predominantly Hindu island of Bali. Furthermore, Miss World Organization Chairperson Julia Morley replaced the "Beach Fashion" bikini swimsuit event, with a "Balinese Beach Fabric" sarong cloth event.

References

External links
 Miss World official website

Miss World
2013 beauty pageants
Beauty pageants in Indonesia
2013 in Indonesia
September 2013 events in Asia
Bali